Chaudhary Balram Singh Yadav (22 April 1939 - 2005) was an Indian politician from Uttar Pradesh.

Positions Held 
 1969-74 Member, Uttar Pradesh Legislative Assembly 
 1969-70 Deputy Minister, Uttar Pradesh 
 1971-73 Cabinet Minister, Uttar Pradesh 
 1972-97 Member, All India Congress Committee (A.I.C.C.) 
 1980-84 Member, Uttar Pradesh Legislative Assembly Cabinet Minister, Uttar Pradesh 
 1984 Elected to 8th Lok Sabha 
 1984-88 vice-president, Pradesh Congress Committee (Indira) [P.C.C.(I)], Uttar Pradesh Member, Congress Parliamentary Board (C.P.B.), Uttar Pradesh 
 1988-90 President, P.C.C.(I), Uttar Pradesh 
 1990-96 Member, Rajya Sabha 
 1990 Member, C.P.B., Uttar Pradesh Vice-president, P.C.C., Uttar Pradesh 
 1991-95 Union Minister of State, Mines (Independent Charge) 
 1995-96 Union Minister of State, Planning and Programme Implementation (Independent Charge) 
 1998 Rashtriya Mahasachiv, Samajwadi Party 
 1998 Re-elected to 12th Lok Sabha (2nd term)
 1998-99 Member, Committee on Public Undertakings Member, Committee on Petroleum, Chemicals and Fertilizers Member, House Committee Member, Consultative Committee, Ministry of Civil Aviation.

References

http://www.elections.in/uittar-pradesh/parliamentary-constituencies/mainpuri.html#leader

1939 births
Living people
Lok Sabha members from Uttar Pradesh
Place of birth missing (living people)
India MPs 1984–1989
India MPs 1998–1999
Rajya Sabha members from Uttar Pradesh
Samajwadi Party politicians
Bharatiya Janata Party politicians from Uttar Pradesh
People from Mainpuri district
Uttar Pradesh MLAs 1969–1974
Uttar Pradesh MLAs 1980–1985
India MPs 1999–2004
Indian National Congress politicians from Uttar Pradesh